Marshal of the Royal Thai Air Force Chalermkiat Vatthanangkun (15 August 1914 – 14 April 1960) was the Commander of the Royal Thai Air Force from 1957 until his death in an aircraft crash in Taipei, Taiwan. He briefly held cabinet level offices in 1957.

Vatthanangkun was briefly the Thai Deputy Minister of Transport from 21 March to 10 August 1957. He then took up the post of Deputy Minister of Agriculture, serving from 10 August to 12 September 1957.

Decorations 
 1959 -  Knight Grand Cordon (Special Class) of The Most Exalted Order of the White Elephant
 1958 -  Knight Grand Cordon (Special Class) of The Most Noble Order of the Crown of Thailand
 1959 -  Knight Commander of the Most Illustrious Order of Chula Chom Klao
 1944 -  Bravery Medal with wreath
 1941 -  Victory Medal - Indochina
 1962 -  Victory Medal - World War II
 1934 -  Safeguarding the Constitution Medal
 1947 -  Chakra Mala Medal
 1960 -  King Rama IX Royal Cypher Medal, 2nd

References

|-

Chalermkiat Vatthanangkun
Chalermkiat Vatthanangkun
Chalermkiat Vatthanangkun
Chalermkiat Vatthanangkun
Chalermkiat Vatthanangkun
1914 births
1960 deaths
Victims of aviation accidents or incidents in Taiwan